Igor II Olgovych  (Ihor II Ol'hovych in Ukrainian; , Igor II Ol'govich in Russian; died September 19, 1147), Prince of Chernigov and Grand Prince of Kiev (Kiev, 1146). Son of Oleg Svyatoslavich of Chernigov.

He was the chosen successor of his brother, Vsevolod II of Kiev. Though his brother had extracted promises of loyalty from his Kievan subjects, Igor and his family, the Olgovychi, were unpopular and there was resistance against his accession. The chroniclers accused Igor of being dishonest, greedy, scheming, and violent. He had reigned less than two weeks before the Kievans invited his cousin and rival, Iziaslav Mstyslavych, to be their prince. Reneging on a promise he had made not to seek power, Iziaslav attacked and defeated Igor and his brother Sviatoslav.

Sviatoslav escaped, but Igor got bogged down in some marshes and was unable to flee because of an infirmity in his legs. He was captured, and Iziaslav had him thrown into a pit. He languished in the pit until autumn 1146, when, desperately ill, he requested permission to become a monk. Iziaslav released him, but Igor was so weak he had to be carried from the pit and nearly died of illness. He became a monk at the monastery of St. Feodor in Kiev under the name Ihnati.

In 1147, a mob attacked Igor under the mistaken impression that he intended to usurp Iziaslav's throne. Iziaslav's brother, Volodymyr, tried to rescue Igor, but the mob tore down a balcony on which Igor had sought sanctuary, and thus killed him. His body was dragged behind a cart and exhibited in a market before it could be salvaged by Volodymyr. Miracles were alleged to have occurred around Igor's body, and he was proclaimed a saint-martyr. Eventually his remains were sent to Transfiguration Cathedral, Chernigov.

Sources
 Dimnik, Martin. The Dynasty of Chernigov, 1146-1246, 2003

Grand Princes of Kiev
1147 deaths
Rurik dynasty
Year of birth unknown
Eastern Orthodox monarchs
Ukrainian saints
Russian saints
Olgovichi family